Kung Aagawin Mo ang Langit (International title: Losing Heaven / ) is a Philippine television drama romance series broadcast by GMA Network. Directed by Jay Altajeros, it stars Carla Abellana, Michelle Madrigal and Mike Tan. It premiered on September 19, 2011 on the network's Dramarama sa Hapon line up replacing Sisid. The series concluded on February 3, 2012 with a total of 100 episodes. It was replaced by Broken Vow in its timeslot.

Cast and characters

Lead cast
 Carla Abellana as Ellery Martinez-Alejandro
 Michelle Madrigal as Bridgitte Q. Samonte
 Mike Tan as Jonas Alejandro

Supporting cast
 Ricky Davao as Delfin Martinez 
 Shamaine Centenera-Buencamino as Marissa Martinez 
 Ces Quesada as Leila Quintana-Samonte
 Kevin Santos as Lester Feliciano
 Paolo Ballesteros as Aloha 
 Jan Marini as Sonia Tercero 
 Will Devaughn as Waldy Buenafe
 Steph Henares as Janice Baluarte 
 Rochelle Barrameda as Cecile Samonte
 Frank Garcia as Donald Salvacion
 RJ Salvador as Aaron Samonte 
 Elijah Alejo as Samantha Alejandro 
 Rich Asuncion as Nadia 
 Frank Magalona as Atty. Enrico Fernandez

Guest cast
 Dianne Hernandez as Jenna Quirante
 Candace Kucsulain as Monique Hilario
 Crispin Pineda as Dante Morales
 Ross Fernando as young Jonas
 Christopher de Leon as Jonas' dad
 Andrea Torres as Justin

Ratings
According to AGB Nielsen Philippines' Mega Manila household television ratings, the pilot episode of Kung Aagawin Mo ang Langit earned a 13.9% rating. While the final episode scored a 25.2% rating.

References

External links
 

2011 Philippine television series debuts
2012 Philippine television series endings
Filipino-language television shows
GMA Network drama series
Philippine romance television series
Television shows set in the Philippines